Live at Winterland 1978 is a live album by the Avengers. It was released through online music stores on February 16, 2010. The album features a recording of their set on January 14, 1978 at the Winterland Ballroom in San Francisco, CA, when they opened for the Sex Pistols on what would become the Sex Pistols final show, before reuniting years later. The Sex Pistols' set has been released on an album of the same name. Songs from this album were previously released on a couple 7" bootlegs titled Penelope and Summer of Hate.

Track listing
 "The Amerikan in Me" – 2:07
 "Desperation" – 2:07
 "Paint It Black" – 2:57
 "Friends of Mine" – 2:20
 "Open Your Eyes" – 2:03
 "No Martyr" – 2:36
 "Teenage Rebel" – 2:34
 "Crazy Homicide" – 2:11
 "The End of the World" – 2:58
 "Summer of Hate" – 1:52
 "We Are the One" – 2:22
 "I Believe in Me" – 2:50
 "Car Crash" – 4:30

Personnel
Penelope Houston – vocals
Greg Ingraham – guitar
Danny Furious – drums
Jimmy Wilsey – bass

References

Avengers (band) albums
CD Presents albums
2010 live albums